St. Anne's is an unincorporated community in the Canadian province of Newfoundland and Labrador in Placentia Bay. It was originally known as Ann's Cove.

See also
List of communities in Newfoundland and Labrador

Ghost towns in Newfoundland and Labrador